This is a list of schools in the Royal Borough of Greenwich in London, England.

State-funded schools

Primary schools 
Source

Alderwood Primary School	
Alexander McLeod Primary School
Bannockburn Primary School
Bishop John Robinson CE Primary School
Boxgrove Primary School
Brooklands Primary School
Cardwell Primary School
Charlton Manor Primary School
Cherry Orchard Primary School
Christ Church CE Primary School, Greenwich
Christ Church CE Primary School, Shooters Hill
Conway Primary School
De Lucy Primary School
Deansfield Primary School
Discovery Primary School
Ealdham Primary School	
Eglinton Primary School
Eltham CE Primary School	
Fossdene Primary School
Foxfield Primary School
Gallions Mount Primary School
Gordon Primary School
Greenacres Primary School
Greenslade Primary School
Haimo Primary School
Halstow Primary School
Hawksmoor School
Henwick Primary School
Heronsgate Primary School
Holy Family RC Primary School
Horn Park Primary School
Invicta Primary School
James Wolfe Primary School
Kidbrooke Park Primary School
Linton Mead Primary School
Meridian Primary School
Middle Park Primary School
Millennium Primary School
Montbelle Primary School
Morden Mount Primary School
Mulgrave Primary School
Nightingale Primary School
Notre Dame RC Primary School
Our Lady of Grace RC Primary School
Plumcroft Primary School
Rockliffe Manor Primary School
St Alfege with St Peter’s CE Primary School
St Joseph’s RC Primary School
St Margaret Clitherow RC Primary School
St Margaret’s CE Primary School
St Mary Magdalene CE All Through School
St Mary’s RC Primary School
St Patrick’s RC Primary School
St Peter’s RC Primary School
St Thomas A Becket RC Primary School
St Thomas More RC Primary School
Sherington Primary School
South Rise Primary School
Thorntree Primary School
Timbercroft Primary School
Windrush Primary School
Wingfield Primary School
Woodhill Primary School
Wyborne Primary School

Secondary schools
Source

Ark Greenwich Free School
Eltham Hill School
The Halley Academy
Harris Academy Greenwich
The John Roan School
Leigh Academy Blackheath
Plumstead Manor School
Royal Greenwich Trust School
St Mary Magdalene CE All Through School
St Paul's Academy
St Thomas More Catholic School
St Ursula's Convent School
Stationers' Crown Woods Academy
Thomas Tallis School
Woolwich Polytechnic School for Boys
Woolwich Polytechnic School for Girls

Special and alternative schools
Charlton Park Academy
King's Oak School
Newhaven Pupil Referral Unit
Waterside School
Willow Dene School

Further education
Anglian College London
Greenwich Community College
Shooters Hill Sixth Form College

Independent schools

Primary and preparatory schools
Blackheath Preparatory School
The Pointer School
St Olave's Preparatory School

Senior and all-through schools
Bellerbys College
Blackheath High School
Colfe's School
Greenwich Engineering and Medical School
Greenwich Steiner School
Riverston School

Special and alternative schools
Pulse and Water College 
Right Choice Independent Special School
Serenity School
Social Arts for Education
StreetVibes Media Academy
Wize Up

References 

 
Greenwich